Hearst (formerly, Travelers Home) is an unincorporated community in Mendocino County, California.

Hearst is a small farming unincorporated community near Willits. The area consists of large farming and ranch estates. There are also many landowners operating hospitality services on portions of their lands geared towards camping, hunting, fishing, trekking, and other outdoor activity. It is also known as Emandal or Emandal Resort after Hearst's largest cabin resort and farm. It is located at Latitude: 39.49333 : Longitude: -123.18083.

One mile west was the Kinsner Soda Spring, which formerly produced and sold drinking water.

A post office operated at Hearst from 1891 to 1953, having moved in 1898. The name honors Senator George Hearst.

References

Unincorporated communities in California
Unincorporated communities in Mendocino County, California